AACAP may refer to:

 American Academy of Child and Adolescent Psychiatry
 Army Aboriginal Community Assistance Program, Australian federal program